The 2019 New Holland Canadian Junior Curling Championships was held from January 19 to 27 at the Art Hauser Centre in Prince Albert, Saskatchewan. The winners represented Canada at the 2019 World Junior Curling Championships in Liverpool, Nova Scotia.

Men

Round-robin standings

Championship pool standings

Playoffs

Semifinal
Saturday, January 26, 19:00

Final
Sunday, January 27, 15:00

Women

Round-robin standings

Championship pool standings

Tiebreaker
Friday, January 25, 14:00

Playoffs

Semifinal
Saturday, January 26, 13:00

Final
Sunday, January 27, 10:00

Qualification

The Canola Junior Provincial Championship presented by Telus were held from January 3, 2019 - January 7, 2019 at the Heather Curling Club in Winnipeg, Manitoba.

The championship was held in a round robin format, which qualified four teams for a page-playoff championship round.

Pre-Playoff Results:

Playoff Results:
Men's A1 vs B1: Ryan 8 - Walter 6
Men's A2 vs B2: McDonald 7 - Wiebe 4
Men's Semifinal: McDonald 8 - Walter 6
Men's Final: Ryan 10 - McDonald 1

Women's A1 vs B1: Walter 10 - Bevan 5
Women's A2 vs B2: Zacharias 11 - Bergman 6
Women's Semifinal: Zacharias 8 - Bevan 1
Women's Final: Zacharias 8 - Walter 2

The New Brunswick Papa John's Pizza U21 Championships were held from December 27–30, 2018 at the Capital Winter Club in Fredericton, New Brunswick.

The championship was held in a modified triple-knockout format, which qualified three teams for a championship round.

Pre-Playoff Results:

Playoff Results:
Men's Semifinal: Smeltzer 9 - Marin 6
Men's Final (N/A): Smeltzer - Smeltzer

No women's playoff was required as Team Comeau won all three qualifying events.

The AMJ Campbell U21 Championships were held from December 27–31, 2018 at the Lakeshore Curling Club in Lower Sackville, Nova Scotia.

The championship was held in a modified triple-knockout format, which qualified three teams for a championship round.

Pre-Playoff Results:

Playoff Results:
Men's Semifinal: Manuel 8 - Weagle 4
Men's Final: Weagle 10 - Manuel 4

Women's Semifinal: Jones 10 - Ladouceur 3
Women's Final (N/A): Jones - Jones

The Ontario U21 Provincial Championships were held December 27–30, 2018 at the Annandale Golf & Curling Club in Ajax.

Pre-Playoff Results:

Playoff Results:
Men's Tiebreaker: Poole 4 - Goodkey 2
Men's Semifinal: Mooibroek 8 - Poole 2
Men's Final: Steep 8 - Mooibroek 7

Women's Tiebreaker: Coburn 6 - Auld 5
Women's Semifinal: Coburn 7 - Wallinford 6
Women's Final: Coburn 9 - Bernard 5

The Pepsi PEI Provincial Junior Curling Championships were held from December 27–30, 2018 at the Charlottetown Curling Club in Charlottetown, Prince Edward Island.

The championship was held in a modified triple-knockout format, which qualified three teams for a championship round.

Pre-Playoff Results:

Playoff Results:
 No playoff games were required as Team Smith and Team Ferguson both won all three qualifying events.

References

External links
Official website
Men's results
Women's results

Junior Championships
Curling in Saskatchewan
Canadian Junior Curling Championships
2019 in Saskatchewan
January 2019 sports events in Canada
Sport in Prince Albert, Saskatchewan